Patricia Karvelas (born 29 January 1981) is an Australian radio presenter, current affairs journalist and political correspondent.

Karvelas currently hosts RN Breakfast on Radio National.

Early life 
Karvelas was born in Australia to Greek migrants who moved to Melbourne in the late 1960s. Her father was from the village of Foinikounta in the Peloponnese region of Greece. When Karvelas was 8 years old, both her parents died suddenly and she lived with her maternal grandmother and later her two older sisters, Voula and Sue in Carlton.

Karvelas attended a number of schools but completed her senior schooling years at University High School and graduated from RMIT University.

Early career 
Karvelas' journalism career began around 1994 when, as a young teenager, she joined the community radio station 3CR Melbourne. She hosted programs such as Wednesday Breakfast and Girl Zone. By the age of 15 she was also a guest presenter at 3RRR. Karvelas stayed at 3CR until the year 2000 when she briefly worked for the ABC and SBS.

Career at The Australian

Trampled by a police horse as a cadet
Karvelas started working as a cadet journalist for the Rupert Murdoch-owned newspaper The Australian around 2002. In November 2002, while covering the protests against the WTO in Sydney, Karvelas was knocked over and trampled by a police horse that was being utilised to charge into and disperse the protestors. She was severely injured and sent to hospital with a suspected broken pelvis. She was later discharged after being treated for a head wound and severe bruising to her lower abdominal area.

Welfare reform reporting
From 2004 Karvelas authored a number of articles in The Australian that gave favourable coverage to the Howard government's tough reforms on welfare. These articles were written under headlines such as Tougher checks for job cheats, Welfare cut would save $100 million, Toughen rules on teenage mums, and Tougher dole for shirkers. It has been stated that labelling the long-term unemployed by terms such as "shirkers" was rhetoric designed to facilitate the introduction of measures that punished this low socio-economic group.

Indigenous affairs reporting
During her tenure at The Australian, Karvelas became noted for reporting on Indigenous affairs during a time when highly significant policies such as the Northern Territory Intervention and the Apology to Australia's Indigenous peoples were occurring.

Karvelas wrote articles such as Crusade to save aboriginal kids: Howard declares "National Emergency" to end abuse that were supportive of the Liberal Party's Intervention in the Northern Territory. In 2007, she wrote a piece under the title of Aborigines must learn English, which argued that Aboriginal children should not be taught their own languages at school. The article blamed bilingual schooling as the cause of the children's 'failure', and that they should only be taught in English. The article ignored the lack of government funding for these schools as a possible cause of poor outcomes.

When the Australian Labor Party took power later in 2007, Karvelas argued for the continuation of the Intervention through such articles as Labor is 'destroying' NT intervention, How Macklin took on the Left to transform indigenous policy, Fast track on return of permit system and Agency to force NT truant kids from bed to classroom. In her 2008 piece Labor to overhaul Native Title laws, Karvelas implied that Aboriginal people needed intervention into the control of finances earned from mining to prevent them from being "frittered away".

When Kevin Rudd gave the Apology to Australia's Indigenous peoples in 2008, Karvelas' article Wording divides Indigenous leaders focused on the divisions in the opinions on the Apology between prominent Aboriginal people.

Karvelas also produced articles in 2013 such as Overhaul township leases, says Council that promoted the newly elected Abbott government's push to secure 99-year leases over Aboriginal townships, a plan that caused widespread distress to Aboriginal communities.

The "character assassination" of Larissa Behrendt controversy 
In 2011, Karvelas wrote a series of articles in The Australian against Aboriginal lawyer and Harvard graduate Larissa Behrendt which amounted to what has been described as a "disgraceful saga of protracted character assassination". Behrendt was a strong opponent of the NT Intervention and was also involved in a racial discrimination legal case against another News Corporation employee in Andrew Bolt. Karvelas' articles attempted to portray Behrendt as an insincere hypocrite, out-of-touch academic and a "white blackfella" for her writing a tweet against pro-Intervention advocate Bess Price.

Even though Behrendt apologised for the tweet, Karvelas and fellow columnists in The Australian such as Gary Johns (who described Aboriginal culture as being "inconsistent with basic human decency") called for Behrendt's employment at university and government level to be reviewed. Karvelas was afterwards described as "a master of The Australian'''s familiar false-inference, disguised-assumption, report-as-accusation house style" in her attack on Behrendt. Other commentators have written that the pile-on over Behrendt's tweet left out crucial facts and was a pretext for a campaign against an ideological adversary.

Awards and promotions at The Australian
Karvelas won the inaugural Wallace Brown Young Achiever Award for Press Gallery Journalism in 2008. She was later promoted to the Victorian Bureau Chief and Senior National Affairs Journalist for The Australian. One of her notable decisions as Bureau Chief was to employ Rachel Baxendale as a cadet in 2012.

 Sky News Australia host 
From 2016 to 2017, Karvelas became employed at another Murdoch-owned media outlet in Sky News Australia, presenting a weekly program called Karvelas.

 ABC 
Karvelas joined the ABC in 2015, being one of a number of Murdoch media employees to have been brought into the national broadcaster since the 2013 election of a conservative government. She has presented Radio National's program RN Drive since January 2015 and hosted Afternoon Briefing, a national affairs television program on the ABC News 24 channel, from 2018 to 2021. She has also co-hosted a weekly political podcast, The Party Room, with Fran Kelly since April 2016. In 2018, she commenced as host of the weekly interview-based national affairs program National Wrap.In 2019, Karvelas conducted a bizarre interview with Deputy Prime Minister Barnaby Joyce who tried to pin the blame on the Queensland Labor Government for a controversial $80 million water buyback scheme by simply repeating "Labor, Labor, Labor, Labor" several times.

In 2019 and 2020, she spoke at WOMADelaide.

In November 2021, ABC announced that Karvelas would host RN Breakfast'' on ABC Radio National replacing Fran Kelly.

Advocacy for an Indigenous Voice to Parliament 

Karvelas is a strong advocate of the Albanese Government's proposal for an Indigenous Voice to Parliament. She tweeted a message of support from the Labor 2022 election night party, posing with Labor's Indigenous Affairs spokeswoman Linda Burney and writing: "This woman is a legend and looks like she will be the next Indigenous affairs minister #UluruStatement". ABC Managing Director told a Senate Estimates hearing on 29 November that this did "not" demonstrate political bias.

In a 13 Nov article for the ABC, Karvelas likened the referendum to enshrine an indigenous body within the constitution to the same-sex-marriage debate, and endorsed Noel Pearson's claim that "heartless" people opposing the Voice will be easy, writing that it would be "like shooting fish in a barrel because of the racism inherent to the colonisation experience that has not been reckoned with." For RN Breakfast following the National Party's November announcement that it would oppose the Voice, Karvelas conducted an 8 minute combative interview with Nationals Leader David Littleproud, rejecting his arguments as "inaccurate", before conducting a supportive extended 17 minute interview with Voice proponent Noel Pearson, in which he attacked Littleproud and Indigenous Senator Jacinta Price without cross examination.

Personal life 
Karvelas is Greek-Australian. Her parents originate from the Peloponnese region of Greece. She has two children, Stella and Luca, and a long-term partner, Peta Sirec.

References

Australian radio journalists
ABC radio (Australia) journalists and presenters
Living people
Women radio journalists
Sky News Australia reporters and presenters
Australian women television journalists
Australian LGBT journalists
1981 births